This is a selected list of feature films originally released and/or distributed by Miramax. Dates are US release dates.

1980s

1990s

2000s

2010s

2020s

Upcoming films

References

External links 
 Miramax Films at Box Office Mojo

 
Lists of films by studio
American films by studio
Lists of films released by Disney
Lists of Paramount Pictures films
Paramount Global-related lists